The Bird is Gone: A Manifesto is a murder mystery by Stephen Graham Jones.  It was published in 2003 by Fiction Collective 2. The Bird is Gone: A Manifesto is Jones' third novel.

Awards
The novel won the Independent Publishers Award for Multicultural Fiction.

References

2005 American novels
Novels by Stephen Graham Jones
Native American novels
Novels set in the United States
Blackfoot culture
American alternate history novels
FC2 books